Marc Barbé (born 6 May 1961) is a French film actor. He has appeared in more than fifty films.

Selected filmography

References

External links 

1961 births
Living people
Actors from Nancy, France
French male film actors